Roberto Maltagliati (born 7 April 1969 in Cuggiono, Milan) is a former Italian footballer who played as a defender.

During his career of more than eighteen years, including seven in Serie A, he has played for Parma, Torino (from 1994–1995 to 1999–2000), Piacenza, Ancona and Cagliari. He then moved to Spezia, being one of their best players during the 2005–06 Serie C1/A campaign which ended in a surprise promotion ahead of Genoa C.F.C.

In 2007, he signed for newly promoted Serie C2 side Canavese.

References

External links
Gazzetta.it profile 

1969 births
Living people
People from Cuggiono
Association football defenders
Italian footballers
Serie A players
Serie B players
Serie C players
Torino F.C. players
Piacenza Calcio 1919 players
Parma Calcio 1913 players
A.C. Ancona players
Cagliari Calcio players
Spezia Calcio players
A.S.D. SolbiaSommese Calcio players
Footballers from Lombardy
Sportspeople from the Metropolitan City of Milan